A non-scheduled airline is a company that offers unscheduled air transport services of passengers or goods at an hourly or per mile / kilometer charge for chartering the entire aircraft along with crew. A non-scheduled airline may hold domestic or international licences, or both, and operates under the regulations prescribed by its national civil aviation authority.

See also 

Airline
History of non-scheduled airlines in the United States

References 

Airlines
Economics of transport and utility industries
Air charter